House of Dark Shadows is a 1970 American feature-length horror film directed by Dan Curtis, based on his Dark Shadows television series (ABC, 1966–1971). In this film expansion, vampire Barnabas Collins (Jonathan Frid) searches for a cure for vampirism so he can marry a woman who resembles his long-lost fiancée Josette (Kathryn Leigh Scott).

Filming took place at Lyndhurst Estate in Tarrytown, New York, with additional footage at nearby Sleepy Hollow Cemetery. Curtis followed this film one year later with Night of Dark Shadows, another expansion of the Shadows franchise, dealing with the witch Angelique.

Plot

Willie Loomis, the Collins family handyman, is searching for old treasure in the family mausoleum when he accidentally frees Barnabas Collins, a 175-year-old vampire who enslaves him. Upon his release, he attacks Daphne Budd, the secretary to Collinwood's matriarch, Elizabeth Collins Stoddard. She is discovered by Jeff Clark, who takes her back to the house where Dr. Julia Hoffman attends to her.

Later, Barnabas introduces himself to the family under the guise of a "cousin from England". Elizabeth and the others are intrigued by Barnabas and take an instant liking to him. However, Elizabeth's daughter Carolyn Stoddard and Professor T. Eliot Stokes, a friend of the family, are incredulous. Barnabas insists on moving into the Old House and hosting a ball in honor of the family. But on the night of the ball, Carolyn is bitten by Barnabas while she is getting ready.

Later on at the ball, he is introduced to young David Collins' governess and Jeff's girlfriend, Maggie Evans, and is instantly smitten with her, as she bears a striking resemblance to his long-lost fiancée, Josette du Pres. Maggie is thinking about leaving Collinwood, but Barnabas persuades her to stay. Back at the Old House, he tells Willie about Josette and how she took her own life on the night they were to be married. Carolyn overhears and threatens to expose him out of jealousy. Enraged, Barnabas delivers a deadly bite to Carolyn, much to Willie's horror. A shaken Willie takes Carolyn back home; she slowly walks to the doorway, but she is soon discovered slumped in the doorway—dead—by the maid, Mrs. Johnson.

Funeral services are held for Carolyn, and she is buried in the Collins family mausoleum. Dr. Hoffman upon analyzing samples of Carolyn's blood, recognizes a trace of elements of the same unknown virus that was present in Daphne Budd's blood sample. Thereafter, Professor Stokes confers with Julia and tells her that he suspects that the recent attacks in Collinsport may have been caused by a vampire.

Meanwhile, Carolyn rises as a vampire and almost attacks David. Stokes and Julia try to explain, but Elizabeth and Roger refuse to listen. Carolyn's former fiancé Todd encounters her, and she bites him. After he is taken back to Collinwood, the family realize that Stokes and Julia were correct about the vampires. Todd again sneaks out in search of Carolyn, but she is cornered and staked, instantly killing her.

Julia eventually discovers that Barnabas is the vampire responsible. Thus, she visits him at the Old House and convinces him that she can use her methods to make him human and he reluctantly agrees. Julia gives him injections which allow him to walk in the daylight. Over time, Barnabas and Maggie begin to spend time together while Jeff is away in Boston. Stokes confronts Julia about helping Barnabas—and realizes she is love with him—and reminds her that he is in love with Maggie. Overcome with jealousy, Julia gives Barnabas an injection which causes him to age rapidly. Out of rage, he strangles her to death. A terrified Maggie witnesses this and tries to flee, but is caught and bitten by Barnabas before she can escape, and he vows to come back for her. Jeff soon returns, and he is informed of the family history by Stokes and Roger and that Barnabas intends to make Maggie his bride. That night, Barnabas bites Maggie again, rejuvenating him, and then abducts her.

Jeff and the others pursue them; however, Roger and Stokes are killed (both turned into vampires who Jeff kills). Jeff eventually finds Maggie at an old church in a trance and in Josette's wedding gown. Willie warns him against trying to stop Barnabas and knocks him out. Willie leads Maggie out of the room to where Barnabas is waiting for her. He lays her down on an altar and is about to bite her when Jeff wakes up and shoots at him, but Willie, running to stop Barnabas, moves in the way, and is hit by Jeff's crossbow bolt. Barnabas lures Jeff out of his hiding place and forces him to be a witness by placing him in a trance. However, as Barnabas attempts to bite Maggie, he screams in pain as he's struck in his back. Turning around, he's shocked then enraged to discover that it was Willie—in his final act of redemption—who stabbed him with the crossbow bolt. Barnabas strangles the mortally wounded Willie, but Loomis' attack breaks Jeff out of Barnabas's trance long enough for Jeff to finish driving the bolt through the vampire's back, ultimately bursting through his bloody chest. Maggie, now revived, is rescued by Jeff, both briefly observing the bodies of the presumably dead vampire and Willie Loomis before departing the ruined chapel.

In a post-credits scene, Barnabas's body transforms into a bat and then vanishes.

Cast

Production
Dark Shadows producer Dan Curtis began pitching the idea of a film based on his gothic soap opera sometime in 1968.  The project was finally given the greenlight at MGM by company president James Aubrey in 1970. Curtis decided to use the original Barnabas storyline as the basis for the film, but with a modified conclusion.

The film was shot in six weeks for a budget of $750,000.  Principal shooting took place at several historic locations, including the Lyndhurst Estate in Tarrytown, New York, where the production had to work around the scheduled public tours of the house. Additional footage was shot at nearby Sleepy Hollow Cemetery; parts of the locales appeared on the Dark Shadows series as well. Some interior scenes were shot at the Lockwood–Mathews Mansion in Norwalk, Connecticut. Along with the original cast, Dan Curtis added other actors to the cast: Jerry Lacy, who notably played Reverend Trask in the 1795 storyline; Terry Crawford and Michael Stroka, who did the Dark Shadows 1890s segments; Don Briscoe, who played cursed brothers Chris and Tom Jennings; Dennis Patrick, who played Paul Stoddard and Jason McGuire; and George DiCenzo, who did more behind-the-scenes work on the last two years of the show.

Unrestricted by TV's censors, the film is far more graphically violent than its television counterpart, with dripping vampire bites and bloody deaths.  The film was released at the height of the TV show's popularity to great commercial success.

Dark Shadows producer Dan Curtis's original idea had been to edit together footage from the original TV series into a feature-length film, an idea which was quickly abandoned. The TV series was still in production while the film was being made. Some characters had to be temporarily written out of the show so that the actors would be available to appear in the movie.  Barnabas, for example, was trapped in his coffin on the TV show by a failed writer who wanted to use the vampire's life story as the basis for a novel.

Kathryn Leigh Scott was absent from 30 episodes (986 to 1015); Jonathan Frid was absent from 28 episodes (983 to 1010); Grayson Hall was absent from 21 episodes (986 to 1006); John Karlen was absent from 21 episodes (990 to 1010); Nancy Barrett was absent from 20 episodes (991 to 1010): Louis Edmonds was absent from 17 episodes (991 to 1008); Don Briscoe was absent from 15 episodes (986 to 1000); Joan Bennett was absent from 15 episodes (991 to 1006); and David Henesy was absent from 9 episodes (993 to 1001).

The preview version of the film included a scene where young David Collins pretends to hang himself. It was removed because there were concerns some children might "try this at home". No copies of this footage are known to exist. Another scene that was shown in some theaters has Jeff testing out the crossbow before pursuing Barnabas.

A paperback novelization of the film by Marilyn Ross (who had written a series of novels based on the TV show) was published in October 1970.  The novel is based on the original script, and contains some scenes which were either cut from the movie or were never filmed.

Sequel
The second film was originally supposed to bring back Barnabas, and was to be called Curse of Dark Shadows (according to Famous Monsters of Filmland). Before pre-production could begin, however, the series had gone off the air, and Jonathan Frid, fearing being typecast as Barnabas, had moved on to other things. Instead, Night of Dark Shadows was made, focusing on Collinwood after new heir Quentin Collins (David Selby) takes over. Elizabeth Collins Stoddard (played by Joan Bennett in the series and the first film) gets a brief mention in the film, but is not present.

Availability
House of Dark Shadows has been released on VHS, and as a two-sided laserdisc (the laserdisc packaged with Night of Dark Shadows, which is out of print). It is also available on iTunes, on the PlayStation 3 Movie Network (Digital DVD quality), and for rental at Amazon Unbox, now called Prime Video.

Warner Home Video announced the re-release of both films on DVD in 2012; House of Dark Shadows was released for the first time alongside Night of Dark Shadows on DVD and Blu-ray on October 30, 2012.

See also
 List of American films of 1970
Dark Shadows (film)
Vampire film

References

The Dark Shadows Companion: 25th Anniversary Collection, edited by Kathryn Leigh Scott, Pomegranate Press Ltd., 1990, 
Dark Shadows Memories: 35th Anniversary, by Kathryn Leigh Scott, Pomegranate Press Ltd., 2001, 
The Dark Shadows Movie Book: Producer/director Dan Curtis' original shooting scripts from House of Dark Shadows and Night of Dark Shadows, edited by Kathryn Leigh Scott and Jim Pierson, Pomegranate Press Ltd., 1998,

External links
 DarkShadows.com
 
 Sleepy Hollow Cemetery
 
 
 

1970 films
1970 horror films
American supernatural horror films
Dark Shadows
1970s English-language films
Films based on television series
Films directed by Dan Curtis
Films set in country houses
Films set in Maine
Films set in Massachusetts
Films shot in Connecticut
Films shot in New York (state)
Metro-Goldwyn-Mayer films
American vampire films
Gothic horror films
1970s supernatural horror films
1970s American films